The 1990 FIFA World Cup CONMEBOL–OFC qualification play-off was an association football match played over two-legs between Israel and Colombia. The first leg was played at the Estadio Metropolitano Roberto Meléndez in Barranquilla, Colombia on the 15 October 1989; the second leg being played at the Ramat Gan Stadium in Ramat Gan, Israel on the 30 October 1989. 

Both teams had to compete in regional qualifiers to make it to the play-off. home-and-away tie between the winners of the Oceania qualifying tournament, Israel, and the third-best team from the South American (CONMEBOL) qualifying tournament, Colombia. The games were played on 15 and 29 October 1989 in Barranquilla and Ramat Gan respectively. The last time Israel made the finals was Mexico 1970, Colombia was Chile 1962. After winning 3–1 on points (1–0 on aggregate), Colombia qualified for the World Cup.

Venues

Background

Play-off match

First leg

Second leg

See also
1990 FIFA World Cup qualification (OFC)

References

Colombia national football team matches
Israel national football team matches
OFC
Play-off
World
FIFA World Cup qualification inter-confederation play-offs
World
playoff
October 1989 sports events in South America
October 1989 sports events in Asia
Sport in Barranquilla
Sport in Ramat Gan
International association football competitions hosted by Colombia
International association football competitions hosted by Israel